Cleora munditibia is a moth of the  family Geometridae. It is found on Fiji.

The wingspan is 40–44 mm.

The larvae feed on the leaves of Mucuna aterrima.

Subspecies
Cleora munditibia munditibia
Cleora munditibia lauensis Robinson, 1975

References

Moths described in 1927
Cleora
Moths of Fiji